Susana Acosta (born 8 December 1976) is a Mexican racquetball player. Acosta has won several gold medals for Mexico, including at the 2003 Pan Am Games and the 2014 Pan Am Championships. She's also played professionally, with career high ranking of 4th at the end of the 2012-13 Ladies Professional Racquetball Tour (LPRT) season.

Professional career
Acosta has played the women's pro tour since 1999, and has been in the top 10 season ending rankings seven times. She's been a semi-finalist at several pro events, including this season at the US Open. But she has not been in a pro final to date.

International career
Acosta has represented Mexico at numerous international competitions. As a left-hander, Acosta has generally been a doubles player on the Mexican team. Her greatest success, which was her breakthrough, came with Rosy Torres in 2003, when they won doubles gold at the 2003 Pan Am Games by defeating Americans Jackie Paraiso and Kim Russell, 8-15, 15-7, 11-9 in the final,  which was the first ever gold medal for a Mexican team in women's doubles.

Acosta and Torres followed up that victory with gold medals at the 2004 and 2005 Pan Am Championships, and they were also the first Mexican team to win that competition.

Acosta and Torres never won the World Championship, although they were in the final in 2004, when they lost to Americans Paraiso and Russell, 15-10, 10-15, 11-9.

Acosta had played Women's Singles for Mexico at three Central American and Caribbean Games, getting a silver in 1998, gold in 2002 and bronze in 2006 Central American and Caribbean Games, and each year helped Mexico to win gold in the Women's Team event. In the 2010 Central American and Caribbean Games, Acosta again played doubles, but this time with Samantha Salas, and they won gold in women's doubles as well as the women's team event.

Acosta played singles and doubles at the 2014 Pan Am Championships, winning the doubles with Salas, when they beat Maria Jose Vargas and Véronique Guillemette in the final, 10-15, 15-8, 11-7, and was runner up in singles to Vagas, losing that final, 15-8, 15-4.

Acosta also won doubles at the 2010 Pan Am Championships with Salas.

See also
 List of racquetball players

References

External links
LPRT page for Susana Acosta

Living people
Mexican racquetball players
1976 births
Pan American Games gold medalists for Mexico
Pan American Games medalists in racquetball
Central American and Caribbean Games gold medalists for Mexico
Central American and Caribbean Games bronze medalists for Mexico
Competitors at the 2006 Central American and Caribbean Games
Competitors at the 2010 Central American and Caribbean Games
Racquetball players at the 2003 Pan American Games
Central American and Caribbean Games medalists in racquetball
Medalists at the 2003 Pan American Games
Central American and Caribbean Games silver medalists for Mexico
Competitors at the 2002 Central American and Caribbean Games
Competitors at the 1998 Central American and Caribbean Games